Spjelkavik Church is a parish church of the Church of Norway in Ålesund Municipality in Møre og Romsdal county, Norway. It is located in the village of Spjelkavik on the western end of the island of Uksenøya. It is the church for the Spjelkavik parish which is part of the Nordre Sunnmøre prosti (deanery) in the Diocese of Møre. The brick church was built in a hexagonal design in 1987 using plans drawn up by the architect Alf Apalseth. The church seats about 500 people.

See also
List of churches in Møre

References

Buildings and structures in Ålesund
Churches in Møre og Romsdal
Brick churches in Norway
Hexagonal churches in Norway
20th-century Church of Norway church buildings
Churches completed in 1987
1987 establishments in Norway